Svetlana Germanovna Parkhomenko (née Cherneva, ; born October 8, 1962) is a retired Soviet and Russian tennis player and tennis coach. She was the winner of the Soviet singles tennis championships in 1985 and nine times Soviet champion in women's doubles and mixed doubles. On the international level, she was the winner of the 1983 European amateur championships in women's and mixed doubles, bronze medalist of the 1983 Universiade in women's and mixed doubles, and winner of eight WTA Tour doubles tournaments.

Parkhomenko also was the recipient of 1988 WTA Sportsmanship Award.

Biography
In 1978, Svetlana won the singles and doubles title at European Junior Championships (she also won doubles titles in the next two years). In 1978, she also won the Soviet youth championships in singles, girls' and mixed doubles, and in 1980 in singles and girls' doubles. In 1980, she advanced with the Soviet girls team to the finals of Princess Sofia Cup.

Starting in 1981, Svetlana (from 1984 playing under her marriage name Parkhomenko) won the senior Soviet doubles championships eight times (twice in 1987). In addition, she became the singles champion in 1985 and mixed doubles champion in 1983. From 1981, she also played for the Soviet Union Federation Cup team. In total, between 1981 and 1988, she played 28 rubbers for the Soviet team, mostly in doubles with Larisa Savchenko.

In 1983, Cherneva won the European amateur championships in women's and mixed doubles and took bronze in the same disciplines at the 1983 Summer Universiade. From the same year, she started playing in international professional tennis tournaments. In 1984, she won her first ITF titles in San Antonio and Delray Beach, and at the Wimbledon Championships advanced with Savchenko to quarterfinals, after defeating third seed Kathy Horvath and Virginia Ruzici, as well as Chris Evert and Catherine Tanvier. In the next three years, Parkhomenko and Savchenko won seven Virginia Slims tournaments including four in 1987. They played three times in a row at the Virginia Slims Championships, and in March 1986 advanced there to semifinals. In 1987, they reached semifinals at Wimbledon, after defeating world's best pair, recent Grand Slam winners Martina Navratilova and Pam Shriver.

At the start of 1988 season, Parkhomenko was ranked as high as eighth in the WTA doubles rankings. But in 1988, Savchenko broke with her to play doubles with young Natasha Zvereva. Without Savchenko, Parkhomenko struggled to retain her best shape, playing with other partners. She won one WTA tournament with Natalia Bykova and twice reached finals with Leila Meskhi, and at the end of the season, she received the WTA Sportsmanship Award.

After having completely missed 1989 season, Parkhomenko returned to play at the end 1990. In 1991, she was awarded the title of Honoured Master of Sports. In 1992, she returned to the top 10 of the Russian tennis and remained there for two more years. In 1993, she played three ties for the Russia Fed Cup team, winning her doubles games against Ukrainians and Lithuanians. After finishing her playing career in 1995, she coaches at the Moscow CSKA tennis club.

Virginia Slims and WTA career finals

Doubles: 14 (8 titles, 6 runner-ups)

ITF finals

Singles: 8 (3–5)

Doubles: 23 (17–6)

Other finals

Singles (1–1)

Doubles (8–2)

Mixed (1–0)

References

External links
 
 
 
 Parkhomenko (née Cherneva) Svetlana Germanovna at the Russian Tennis Encyclopedia 

Russian female tennis players
Soviet female tennis players
Russian tennis coaches
Tennis players from Moscow
Living people
1962 births
Honoured Masters of Sport of the USSR
Universiade medalists in tennis
Goodwill Games medalists in tennis
Universiade bronze medalists for the Soviet Union
Medalists at the 1983 Summer Universiade
Medalists at the 1985 Summer Universiade
Competitors at the 1986 Goodwill Games
Friendship Games medalists in tennis